Common good is a political and philosophical concept.

Common Good may also refer to:

Organisations

 Italy. Common Good, a political coalition in Italy
 The Common Good (political party), a political party in the United Kingdom

Other
 Common good (economics), goods which are rivalrous and non-excludable
 Common Good Fund, a fund to benefit the people of a former burgh in Scotland
 Economy for the Common Good, a social movement advocating for an alternative economic model

See also
 Maslaha, the corresponding concept in Islamic law
 Common (disambiguation) 
 Commons (disambiguation)
 Commonweal (disambiguation)
 Commonwealth (disambiguation)